Carla-Bayle is a commune in the Ariège department in southwestern France. It was the birthplace of Pierre Bayle (1647–1706), a Protestant philosopher and writer known for his works on religious toleration and his early encyclopedia.

History
Originally named Carla-le-Comte, the commune became a center of Protestant activity in the 16th century before the government suppressed it. Pierre Bayle, the important Protestant philosopher and writer was born here, and taught in his early years by his father, a Protestant minister. He briefly converted to Catholicism, before reverting to the Protestant Reform faith.  His rejection of Catholicism led to his need to leave France.   Later the government Protestant institutions and oppressed Protestants, however the majority of Carla remained Protestant.   A Protestant strong point it was besieged by the royal army and its walls and chateau demolished.

During the revolution the commune was renamed Carla le peuple.   Difficult to keep that name when the monarchy was restored,  happily it had a distinguished son and the commune was renamed Carla-Bayle in honor of Bayle.   Now has a museum devoted to Pierre Bayle and is home to many galleries and a number of artists.

The rural community reached its peak of population at 2030, in 1851. Since urbanization and other forces, had declined by 1982 to 469. Since that time, it has steadily increased, to 745 in 2008.

Population

See also
 List of places named after people
 Communes of the Ariège department

References

External links

 Carla-Bayle website (in French)

Communes of Ariège (department)
Ariège communes articles needing translation from French Wikipedia